The 2000 Lunar New Year Cup (aka Carlsberg Cup) was a football tournament held in Hong Kong over the first and fourth day of the Chinese New Year holiday.

Participating teams
  Czech Republic
  Hong Kong League XI (host)
  Mexico
  Japan

Squads

Czech Republic

Hong Kong League XI

Mexico

Japan

Coach:  Philippe Troussier

Results
All times given in Hong Kong Time (UTC+8).

Semifinals

Third place match

Final

Bracket

Scorers
 2 goals
  Miguel Zepeda
 1 goals
  Marek Jankulovski
  Marek Kincl
  Michal Kolomazník
  Pavel Verbíř
  Cheng Siu Chung
  Alen Bajkusa

See also
Hong Kong Football Association
Hong Kong First Division League

References
 Carlsberg Cup 2000, Rsssf.com
 XVIII. Carlsberg Cup Chinese New Years Tournament 2000 – Details, YANSFIELD

2000
1999–2000 in Hong Kong football
1999–2000 in Czech football
1999–2000 in Mexican football
2000 in Japanese football